Selvyn Estuardo Ponciano Chitay (born 18 July 1973) is a retired Guatemalan football defender and the General Manager of his former club CSD Municipal since 2010.

Club career
The versatile Ponciano has played in all defensive positions as well as a defensive midfielder; he played the majority of his career (13 years) for Guatemala top division club CSD Municipal. He won 11 league titles and 2 domestic cups and also had spells at army club Aurora F.C. and Municipal's eternal rivals Comunicaciones.

He announced his retirement at the end of January 2009 and played his farewell game on February 4 that year to become coach of the Guatemala U-20 national team.

International career
Nicknamed el Bufalo, Ponciano made his debut for Guatemala as a late substitute in a November 1998 friendly match against Mexico and went on to collect a total of 9 caps, scoring 1 goal. He has represented his country in 5 matches during the 2006 World Cup qualification campaign.

His final international was a February 2006 friendly match against the United States.

International goals
Scores and results list. Guatemala's goal tally first.

Managerial career
He was dismissed as national team coach of the Guatemala U20-s and in February 2010 was proposed to return to Aurora as a player.

External links

 Player profile - CSD Municipal

References

1973 births
Living people
Guatemalan footballers
Guatemala international footballers
C.S.D. Municipal players
Aurora F.C. players
Comunicaciones F.C. players
Association football defenders